The ULPower UL520i is a Belgian aircraft engine, designed and produced by ULPower Aero Engines of Geluveld for use in homebuilt aircraft.

Design and development
The engine is a six-cylinder four-stroke, horizontally-opposed,  displacement, air-cooled, direct-drive, gasoline engine design. It employs dual electronic ignition and produces  at 3300 rpm.

Variants
UL520i
Base model with fuel injection and a compression ratio of 8:1, producing  at 3300 rpm
UL520iS
Model with 8.7:1 compression ratio, fuel injection, producing  at 3300 rpm
UL520iST
Model under development, fuel injection, turbo-normalizer, producing  at 2700 rpm sea level
UL520iSA
Inverted oil system version of the UL520iS, producing  at 3300 rpm
UL520iHPS
Model under development
UL520iSRR
Model with reversed rotation, 8.7:1 compression ratio, fuel injection, producing  at 3300 rpm

Applications
Whisper X350 Generation II
DarkAero 1

Specifications (UL520i)

See also

References

External links

ULPower aircraft engines
Air-cooled aircraft piston engines
2010s aircraft piston engines